Hau Tsz Kok Pai is an island of Hong Kong, under the administration of Tai Po District. It is located in Long Harbour, where it is in the North-east of New Territories.

Uninhabited islands of Hong Kong
Tai Po District
Islands of Hong Kong